Daniel José Older is an American fantasy and young adult fiction writer. His work includes the Shadowshaper Cypher series as well as novels in the Star Wars series.

Career
Older's career as a writer began in 2014, in the back of the ambulance where he worked as an EMT in New York City. Older has said that he sees himself as an outsider to the publishing and literary scene. Describing himself as a disruptor,  saying, “I entered the writing world clearly and strategically to do this thing, to write these books, to get them into the world and fuck with people…to generally fuck shit up.”

Older's formal writing foray onto the writing scene came with Salsa Nocturna, in 2012. A collection of stories from the living, the dead, and those in between, Salsa Nocturna serves as an introduction to key characters from his first series, Bone Street Rumba.

Older's debut novel, Half-Resurrection Blues, was published by Penguin Books in the first week of 2015. By the end of January 2015, the production company owned by Anika Noni Rose had optioned the television and films rights to the novel and the following two novels in the Bone Street Rumba series.

Later in 2015, Older's sophomore novel and series, Shadowshaper, was published by Scholastic. Following Older's tradition of inclusive writing, it follows a young Afro-Latina named Sierra who discovers her family's history of supernatural powers and her ability to interact with the spirit world. The book is the first of five works in the Shadowshaper Cypher.
Older has been critical of works that fail to include racial diversity. While he admires The Hunger Games series of novels, he was disappointed in the casting of the film series based on them, writing that the "whitewashing of Katniss was a tremendously unimaginative and useless act." Older has also been critical of "the popular surge of YA dystopias that followed in the wake of the Hunger Games trilogy," calling it "wildly undiverse." He attributes this lack of diversity to a "phenomenal lack of imagination" on the part of the authors, and a laziness, he feels, designed to keep some people out of the picture, saying: "To be able to figure out all these quirky things about what you imagine the future will be like, and not somehow have any folks of color doing anything heroic or worthwhile in it, what happened?"

In 2018 Older released his first Star Wars novel Last Shot, which serves as a tie-in to Solo: A Star Wars Story. It stars Han Solo and Lando Calrissian and takes place between Return of the Jedi and The Force Awakens with flashback settings before and after Solo.

World Fantasy Award Petition
In August 2014, Older started a petition to change the World Fantasy Award statuette from a bust of H. P. Lovecraft to one of African-American author Octavia Butler, on account of Lovecraft's racism, and concerns that it would be disrespectful to recipients, in particular those belonging to non-white ethnicities that Lovecraft held in particular contempt. In November 2015 it was announced that the World Fantasy Award trophy would no longer be modeled on Lovecraft. Older told The Guardian newspaper by email, "If fantasy as a genre truly wants to embrace all of its fans, and I believe it does, we can't keep lionising a man who used literature as a weapon against entire races. Writers of color… raised our voices collectively, en masse, and the World Fantasy folks heard us. Today, fantasy is a better, more inclusive, and stronger genre because of it."

Bibliography

Novels

Shadowshaper Cypher series (Young Adult) 
 Shadowshaper (2015)
 Ghost Girl in the Corner (2016)
 Dead Light March (2017)
 Shadowhouse Fall (2017)
 Shadowshaper Legacy (2020)

Bone Street Rumba series (Adult) 
 Half-Resurrection Blues (2015)
 Midnight Taxi Tango (2016)
 Battle Hill Bolero (2017)

Dactyl Hill Squad series (Middle Grade) 
 Dactyl Hill Squad (2018)
 Freedom Fire (2019)
Thunder Run (2020)

Star Wars 
 Last Shot (2018)
 The High Republic Adventures (2021)
 Race To Crashpoint Tower  (2021)
 Trail of Shadows (2021)
 Midnight Horizon (2022)

Outlaw Saints duology (Young Adult) 
 Ballad & Dagger (2022)

Standalone 
The Book of Lost Saints (2019)

Flood City (2021)

Short fiction

Novellas 
 Anyway: Angie (2014) a Bone Street Rumba novella
 Kia and Gio (2015) a Bone Street Rumba novella
 Ginga (2015) a Bone Street Rumba novella
 Ghost Girl in the Corner (2016) a Shadowshaper novella
 Dead Light March (2017) a Shadowshaper novella

Collections 
 Salsa Nocturna (2012)

As editor 
 Long Hidden: Speculative Fiction from the Margins of History (with Rose Fox, 2014)
Fantasy Magazine: People of Color Destroy Fantasy (2016)

References

External links

21st-century American novelists
American fantasy writers
American male novelists
American writers of young adult literature
American male short story writers
Hispanic and Latino American writers
Hispanic and Latino American novelists
Hispanic and Latino American short story writers
Living people
Social justice
21st-century American short story writers
21st-century American male writers
Year of birth missing (living people)